Presidente Prudente is a city (município) in the state of São Paulo,  Brazil. The city has a population of 230,371 inhabitants (IBGE/2020) and area of 562.8 km². The city is named after president Prudente de Morais. Prudente is located 558 km from the city of São Paulo.

Presidente Prudente is considered the sixth best city in the state of São Paulo to live in. Among 5,560 Brazilian cities, it occupies the 29th place for most promising cities to build a career.

History
Presidente Prudente was founded in 1917.

Demographics
Total Population: 220,599 (IBGE/2014)
Literacy rate: 98%
Human Development Index: 0.846
Regional Population: 806,954 inhabitants.

Geography

Climate
The city is well known for its hot temperatures in summer, when the heat index sometimes exceeds 40 °C (104 °F, in the months of October through February (from spring to summer). However, cold weather prevails in winter, as -1.8 °C (28.8 °F) was recorded in 1975 and 0 °C (32 °F) in 2000.

Education
There are 130 schools and 3 universities in Presidente Prudente that together gather over 80 thousand students.
It also has integrated colleges like Toledo, SESI and SENAI with more than 110 undergraduate courses.

Universities:
 São Paulo State University - UNESP
 University of Western São Paulo - UNOESTE 
 Union of Colleges - UNIESP 

Colleges:
 Toledo Integrated Colleges
 FATEC
 Uninter
 Cesumar
 LFG
 Damasio

Health
In Presidente Prudente there are over 15 hospitals, a Teaching Hospital, Santa Casa da Misericórdia (Sisters of Mercy), 20 establishments of health service, and more than 11 private clinics.

The Teaching Hospital (Hospital Universitário in Portuguese) (HU/HR) was once the largest university hospital in Latin America.

Economy
The Tertiary sector is the most relevant for the city, corresponding to 80.94% of Prudente's GDP. The Secondary sector is 18.40% of the GDP and the Primary sector corresponds to 0.65%.

Culture
The city of Presidente Prudente has theatres, 13 social clubs, like the Eduardo José Farah's Stadium (with the largest capacity in the interior of Brazil - 45,000 people) and the "Rancho Quarto de Milha" is the largest indoor arena in Latin America.

Transportation
SP-270 Rodovia Raposo Tavares
SP-425 Rodovia Assis Chateaubriand
SP-501 Rodovia Júlio Budisk

Presidente Prudente has scheduled air connections to and from Presidente Prudente Airport.

Notable people
Camilo Sanvezzo, footballer
Antônio Carlos Zago, footballer
Pablo (Pablo Freitas Cardoso Mello)
Thaila Ayala, actress and model
Thiaguinho, singer

References

External links

 http://www.presidenteprudente.sp.gov.br/ Official Site of the Prefecture (in Portuguese).
 UNESP University (in Portuguese).
 Satellite photo of Presidente Prudente. Google Maps.
 Unoeste University (in Portuguese).
 https://archive.today/20121127030422/http://www.defesacivil.sp.gov.br/novo/index.asp (in Portuguese).

 
Populated places established in 1917